Vicente or Vincente de Cervantes  (1755 in Ledrada – 1829 in Mexico) was a notable Spanish and Mexican physician and botanist.

Background
Don Vicente Cervantes was a contemporary of Martín Sessé y Lacasta and corresponded with Jean-Louis Berlandier, the French naturalist who botanized in Mexico and Texas as part of the Mexican Boundary Commission. He was also the first Professor of Botany in New Spain, at the Royal Botanic Garden in Mexico City.

It is after him that the magnificent Odontoglossum orchid, the "Cervantes Odontoglot" (Odontoglossum cervantesii), is named.

Juan Diego del Castillo (d. 1793) joined Cervantes in Mexico.  Del Castillo left a large sum of money towards the printing of their projected book Flora Mexicana.  Cervantes named the genus Castilla, consisting of three large latex yielding trees, after him.

Notes

Publications
Vicente de Cervantes, Castilla, in Gazeta de Literatura de México 1794, Suppl.: 7. (2 July 1794)

References
"La realidad se ha convertido en una materia" Enciclopedia de México, v. 2. Mexico City: 1987.

External links
Berlandier papers at Harvard

1755 births
1829 deaths
People from the Province of Salamanca
18th-century Spanish botanists
19th-century Spanish botanists